Thomas Dacre may refer to:
 Thomas Dacre, 2nd Baron Dacre (1467–1525), English nobleman
 Thomas Dacre, 4th Baron Dacre (c. 1527–1566), English Member of Parliament and peer
 Thomas Dacre, 6th Baron Dacre (1387–1458), English nobleman
 Thomas Dacre (knight) (1410–1448)
Tom Dacre, a character in the poem "The Chimney Sweeper"

See also
Thomas Dacres (1587–1668), English politician
Thomas Dacres (younger) (1609–1668)